Acanthis (not to be confused with Acanthus) may refer to:

 Acanthis, a genus of birds known as the redpolls
 Acanthis (mythology), figure in Greek mythology